Lehe is a municipality in the Emsland district, in Lower Saxony, Germany.

References

External links 
 

Emsland